Princeton Aerodrome  is located adjacent to Princeton, British Columbia, Canada.

History
The aerodrome was listed as "under construction - serviceable" with one runways as follows:

The airport was originally intended as an alternate landing area for early commercial aviation. The main (highest traffic) use of the airport was as the home of the Royal Canadian Air Cadet Regional Gliding School whose traffic peaked annually each July and August. The Gliding School moved to Chilliwack Airport after the 1991 season and then to Canadian Forces Base Comox. 

The airport has undergone some improvements since the early 1990s. Fuel is now available, both Jet A (22,000 litres) and 100LL (13,000 litres). All major credit cards are accepted through a self serve system. For larger turbine aircraft, a certified fuel truck which holds 7,000 litres of Jet A can be brought to the waiting aircraft.

References

External links
Princeton Airport on COPA's Places to Fly airport directory

Registered aerodromes in British Columbia
Regional District of Okanagan-Similkameen
Royal Canadian Air Force stations
Military airbases in British Columbia
Military history of British Columbia